The Chevrolet Blazer is an automobile nameplate used by General Motors for its Chevrolet brand since 1969 for several SUV models:

 Full-size Chevrolet K5 Blazer, based on the C/K pickup chassis and built from 1969 to 1995 (renamed Blazer in 1992 and Tahoe in 1995 for the 2-door model)
 Compact and mid-size Chevrolet S-10 Blazer, based on the S-10 pickup and built from 1983 to 2012
 Chevrolet Tahoe, sold in Argentina, Brazil, Ecuador, and Venezuela under the "Grand Blazer" name from 1990 to 2000
 Chevrolet Blazer (crossover), a mid-size crossover produced since 2019
 Chevrolet Blazer EV, an upcoming battery electric mid-size crossover

See also 
 Chevrolet Trailblazer

Blazer
Cars introduced in 1969